Sar Cheshmeh-ye Olya (also Romanized as Sar Cheshmeh-ye ‘Olyā) is a village in Howmeh-ye Gharbi Rural District, in the Central District of Ramhormoz County, Khuzestan Province, Iran. At the 2006 census, its population was 148, in 27 families.

References 

Populated places in Ramhormoz County